Cuba competed at the 1976 Summer Olympics, held in Montreal, Quebec,  Canada. 156 competitors (132 men and 24 women) took part in 76 events covering 14 sports.

Medalists

Gold
Alberto Juantorena — Athletics, Men's 400 metres
Alberto Juantorena — Athletics, Men's 800 metres
Jorge Hernández — Boxing, Men's Light Flyweight
Ángel Herrera — Boxing, Men's Featherweight
Teófilo Stevenson — Boxing, Men's Heavyweight
Héctor Rodríguez — Judo, Men's Lightweight

Silver
Alejandro Casañas — Athletics, Men's 110m Hurdles
Ramón Duvalón — Boxing, Men's Flyweight
Andrés Aldama — Boxing, Men's Light Welterweight
Sixto Soria — Boxing, Men's Light Heavyweight

Bronze
Rolando Garbey — Boxing, Men's Light Middleweight
Luis Martínez — Boxing, Men's Middleweight
Alfredo Figueredo, Victor García, Diego Lapera, Leonel Marshall Steward, Sr., Ernesto Martínez, Lorenzo Martínez, Jorge Pérez, Antonio Rodríguez, Carlos Salas, Victoriano Sarmientos, Jesús Savigne, and  Raúl Virches — Volleyball, Men's Team Competition

Athletics

Men's 400 metres
 Carlos Noroña
 Heat — 48.46 (→ did not advance)

Men's 800 metres
 Alberto Juantorena
 Heat — 1:47.15
 Semi Final — 1:45.88
 Final — 1:43.50 (→  Gold Medal)
 Leandro Civil
 Heat — 1:45.88
 Semi Final — 1:47.31 (→ did not advance)
 Luis Medina
 Heat — 1:50.15 (→ did not advance)

Men's 1500 metres
 Luis Medina
 Heat — 3:42.71 (→ did not advance)

Men's 4x100 metres Relay
Francisco Gómez, Alejandro Casañas, Hermes Ramirez, and Silvio Leonard
 Heat — 39.54s
 Semi Final — 39.25s
 Final — 39.01s (→ 5th place)

Men's 4x400 metres Relay 
 Eddy Gutierrez, Damaso Alfonso, Carlos Alvarez, and Alberto Juantorena
 Heat — 3:03.24
 Final — 3:03.81 (→ 7th place)

Men's 400m Hurdles
 Damaso Alfonso
 Heats — 50.76s
 Semi Final — 49.84s
 Final — 50.19s (→ 7th place)

Men's Marathon
 Rigoberto Mendoza — 2:22:43 (→ 33rd place)

Men's Long Jump 
 Milan Matos
 Qualification — 7.57m (→ did not advance)

Men's triple jump 
 Pedro Pérez
 Qualification — 16.51m
 Qualification — 16.81m (→ 4th place)
 Armando Herrera
 Qualification — 15.98m (→ did not advance, 19th place)

Men's High Jump
 Richard Spencer
 Qualification — 2.05m (→ did not advance)

Men's Discus Throw
 Julián Morrinson
 Qualification — 59.92m (→ did not advance)

Women's Shot Put
María Elena Sarría
Final — 16.31 m (→ 11th place)

Basketball

Men's team competition
Preliminary round (group A):
 Defeated Australia (111-89)
 Lost to Canada (79-84)
 Defeated Japan (97-56)
 Defeated Mexico (89-75)
 Lost to Soviet Union (72-98)
Classification Matches:
 5th/8th place: Lost to Czechoslovakia (79-91)
 7th/8th place: Defeated Australia (92-81) → 7th place
Team Roster
Juan Domecq
Ruperto Herrera
Juan Roca
Pedro Chappe
Alejandro Ortíz
Rafael Cañizares
Daniel Scott
Angel Padron
Tomás Herrera
Oscar Varona
Alejandro Urgelles
Felix Morales
Head coach: Carmilo Hortega

Boxing

Men's Light Flyweight (– 48 kg)
 Jorge Hernández
 First Round – Defeated Beyhan Fuchedzhiev (BUL), RSC-3
 Second Round – Defeated Zoffa Yarawi (PNG), KO-3
 Quarterfinals – Defeated Park Chan-Hee (KOR), 3:2
 Semifinals – Defeated Orlando Maldonado (PUR), 5:0
 Final – Defeated Li Byong-Uk (PRK), 4:1 →  Gold Medal

Men's Flyweight (– 51 kg)
 Ramón Duvalón
 First Round — Bye
 Second Round — Defeated Souley Hancaradu (NIG), walkover
 Third Round — Defeated Toshinori Koga (JPN), 5:0
 Quarterfinal — Defeated Ian Clyde (CAN), 5:0
 Semi Final — Defeated David Torosyan (URS), DSQ-2
 Final — Lost to Leo Randolph (USA), 2:3 →   Silver Medal

Cycling

Six cyclists represented Cuba in 1976.

Individual road race
 Carlos Cardet — 4:49:01 (→ 14th place)
 Roberto Menéndez — did not finish (→ no ranking)
 Gregorio Aldo Arencibia — did not finish (→ no ranking)
 Jorge Pérez — did not finish (→ no ranking)

Team time trial
 Carlos Cardet
 Gregorio Aldo Arencibia
 Jorge Gómez
 Raúl Marcelo Vázquez

Individual pursuit
 Raúl Marcelo Vázquez — 17th place

Fencing

13 fencers, 9 men and 4 women, represented Cuba in 1976.

Men's foil
 Enrique Salvat
 Jorge Garbey
 Eduardo Jhons

Men's team foil
 Eduardo Jhons, Enrique Salvat, Jorge Garbey, Pedro Hernández

Men's sabre
 Francisco de la Torre
 Manuel Ortíz
 Guzman Salazar

Men's team sabre
 Manuel Ortíz, Francisco de la Torre, Guzman Salazar, Ramón Hernández, Lazaro Mora

Women's foil
 Margarita Rodríguez
 Milady Tack-Fang
 Nancy Uranga

Women's team foil
 Milady Tack-Fang, Marlene Font, Nancy Uranga, Margarita Rodríguez

Football

Gymnastics

Judo

Men's Lightweight
Héctor Rodríguez

Men's Half-Heavyweight
José Ibañez

Men's Open Class
José Ibañez

Rowing

Shooting

Volleyball

Men's team competition
Preliminary round (group A)
 Defeated Czechoslovakia (3-1)
 Lost to Poland (2-3)
 Defeated South Korea (3-0)
 Defeated Canada (3-0)
Semi Finals
 Lost to Soviet Union (0-3)
Bronze Medal Match
 Defeated Japan (3-0) →  Bronze Medal
Team Roster
Leonel Marshall Steward, Sr.
Victoriano Sarmientos
Ernesto Martínez
Victor García
Carlos Salas
Raúl Vilches
Jesús Savigne
Lorenzo Martínez
Diego Lapera
Antonio Rodríguez
Alfredo Figueredo
Jorge Pérez
Head coach: Herrera Idolo

Women's team competition
Preliminary round (group B)
 Defeated East Germany (3-1)
 Lost to Soviet Union (1-3)
 Lost to South Korea (2-3)
Classification Matches
 5th/8th place: Defeated Canada (3-2)
 5th/6th place: Defeated East Germany (3-0) → Fifth place
Team Roster
Mercedes Perez
Imilses Telles
Ana Díaz
Mercedes Pomares
Lucila Urgelles
Mercedes Roca
Miriam Herrera
Claudina Villaurrutia
Melanea Tartabull
Nelly Barnet
Ana María García
Evelina Borroto
Head coach: Eugenio George

Water polo

Men's team competition
Team Roster
David Rodríguez
Eugenio Almenteros
Gerardo Rodríguez
Jesús Pérez
Jorge Rizo
Lazaro Costa
Nelson Domínguez
Oriel Domínguez
Oscar Periche
Osvaldo García
Ramon Peña

Weightlifting

Wrestling

References

External links
Official Olympic Reports
International Olympic Committee results database

Nations at the 1976 Summer Olympics
1976 Summer Olympics
Olympics